Santiago Gómez Cousillas (September 26, 1903 in Montevideo, Uruguay – March 24, 1984 in Buenos Aires, Argentina) was a classic Uruguayan - Argentine actor who appeared in films between 1936 and 1980.

Born in Montevideo, Uruguay, Cou moved to Buenos Aires to pursue a career as a screen actor. He  appeared in his first film in 1936. He made 65 screen appearances in Argentina and the United States between 1936 and 1980. He appeared in films such as The Grandfather in 1954 alongside actors Enrique Muino and Mecha Ortiz.

Selected filmography
 The Life of Carlos Gardel (1939)
 Story of a Poor Young Man (1942)
 The Desire (1944)
 A Woman of No Importance (1945)
 The Three Rats (1946)
 The Orchid (1951)
 The Count of Monte Cristo (1953)
 The Black Market (1953)
 El Abuelo (1954)
 La Procesión (1960)
 Crimen sin olvido (1968)

External links
 

1903 births
1984 deaths
Expatriate male actors in Argentina
Argentine male film actors
Male actors from Montevideo
Uruguayan emigrants to Argentina
Uruguayan expatriate actors in Argentina
Uruguayan male film actors
Uruguayan radio actors
20th-century Argentine male actors